Gerald Weil Nachman (January 13, 1938 – April 14, 2018) was an American journalist and author from San Francisco.

Biography
Nachman was born January 13, 1938, to Leonard Calvert Nachman, a salesman and actor in the Little Theater movement, and Isabel (Weil) Nachman. He received an associate of arts degree from Merritt College, in 1958, and then a bachelor of arts degree from San Jose State University in 1960, beginning as a TV reviewer and humor columnist at what was then called the San Jose Mercury while he was still a student.

He was a feature writer for the New York Post from 1964–66 and a feature writer and TV critic for New York Daily News from 1972–79, with a stop in the middle as columnist and film critic for the Oakland Tribune. For a time he was best known for his syndicated humor columns, “Double Take” and “The Single Life.” In 1979, he joined The Chronicle as a columnist and theater critic, reviewing not just theater but also film, cabaret and comedy. He left the newspaper in 1993 but continued to be active, appearing on KALW's radio show "Minds Over Matter."

Career
1963 TV writer for the San Jose Mercury News.
1963–1966 feature writer for the New York Post
1966–1971 theater and film writer for the Oakland Tribune
1972–1979 columnist, syndicated by the New York Daily News
1979–1993 entertainment and theater writer for the San Francisco Chronicle.
1993–2015 panelist, Minds Over Matter, KALW; accessed April 18, 2018.

Death
Nachman died April 14, 2018, at Coventry Place, a senior residence in San Francisco, California, at the age of 80.

Awards

 ASCAP Deems Taylor Award
 New York Newspaper Guild Page One Award

Books

Musical Comedy Revues
Quirks (1979)
Aftershocks (1993)
New Wrinkles (2002)

References

External links

Gerald Nachman guest column in The San Francisco Examiner

1938 births
2018 deaths
New York Post people
Jewish American journalists
20th-century American journalists
American male journalists
The Mercury News people
Oakland Tribune people
Writers from the San Francisco Bay Area
21st-century American Jews